Enrique Figueroa Suárez (born February 25, 1964), also known as "Quique Figueroa", is a Puerto Rican sailor. Figueroa is the only sailor of Puerto Rico to win four gold medals in the Central American-Caribbean Games. He has also competed at five Olympic Games, from 1988 to 2004 and in 2020. In 1999, Figueroa and his wife Carla Malatrasi won a gold medal in sailing in the Pan Am Hobie competition celebrated in Winnipeg, Manitoba, Canada. On March 3, 2003 the Senate of Puerto Rico honored Enrique Figueroa and his wife Carla Malatrasi by recognizing their achievements.

Early years
He was born in San Juan, Puerto Rico, where he was raised and where he went to school receiving his primary and secondary education. He first became interested and participated in sailing when he was ten years old.  In 1980, when he was sixteen, he participated in his first competition, the 3rd "Hobie 16 worlds" celebrated in St. Croix, U.S. Virgin Islands where he came in 3rd place.  The following year (1981), he participated in the 6th Hobie Fourteen Worlds in Fortaleza, Brazil where he came first.

In 1984, Figueroa was in the 7th Hobie 14 Worlds celebrated in Puerto Azul, Philippines and came 3rd; in the same year, he enrolled the Universidad del Sagrado Corazon (Sacred Heart University) in San Juan, Puerto Rico, where he majored in Business Marketing.

Competitions
Among the other competitions in which Figueroa has participated are:
 In 1985, Hobie 14 Worlds in Isla Verde, Puerto Rico where he won 1st place and
 In 1986, 6th Hobie 16 Worlds in Suva, Fiji where he took 2nd place.

In 1994, Figueroa won the IYRU World Sailing Championship title. He met and married Carla Malatrasi, a sportswoman from Puerto Rico who also loves sailing.  In 1999, Figueroa and his wife Malatrasi won a gold medal in sailing in the Pan Am Hobie competition celebrated in Winnipeg, Canada.  Figueroa competed in the 2000 Olympic Games held in Sydney, Australia without his wife.  She stayed behind to give birth to the first of their two daughters, Isabella Victoria.  In 2002, Figueroa and his wife came in 3rd place in the Hobie Racing-ISAF Sailing Games H-16 which took place in Marseille, France in which they went against 36 teams representing 20 nations.

On February 2, 2004, Figueroa and teammate Jorge Hernández,  won the Olympic Games Rolex Regatta; they were named champions by beating twenty-nine entries in the tornado fleet.  The regatta winners had their sights set on the 2004 Olympics and Partalympic Games in Athens, Greece.  503 sailors participated with a fleet of 323 boats representing 39 nations.  Figueroa went to the 2004 Olympic Games and represented Puerto Rico at the Olympics for the fourth time.

Honors and recognitions
On March 3, 2003 the Senate of Puerto Rico honored Enrique Figueroa and his wife Carla Malatrasi by recognizing their achievements.  Figueroa has been named "Puerto Rican National Sportsman of the Year" in sailing for 10 consecutive years.

See also

 List of Puerto Ricans
 Sports in Puerto Rico

Notes

References

External links
 
 
 

1964 births
Living people
Puerto Rican male sailors (sport)
Olympic sailors of Puerto Rico
Sailors at the 1988 Summer Olympics – Tornado
Sailors at the 1992 Summer Olympics – Tornado
Sailors at the 2000 Summer Olympics – Tornado
Sailors at the 2004 Summer Olympics – Tornado
Sailors at the 2020 Summer Olympics – Nacra 17
Pan American Games gold medalists for Puerto Rico
Pan American Games bronze medalists for Puerto Rico
Pan American Games medalists in sailing
Sailors at the 1999 Pan American Games
Sailors at the 2003 Pan American Games
Sailors at the 2007 Pan American Games
Sailors at the 2011 Pan American Games
Sailors at the 2015 Pan American Games
Medalists at the 2003 Pan American Games
Medalists at the 2007 Pan American Games
Medalists at the 2011 Pan American Games
Medalists at the 2015 Pan American Games
Central American and Caribbean Games gold medalists for Puerto Rico
Central American and Caribbean Games medalists in sailing
Competitors at the 2006 Central American and Caribbean Games
Competitors at the 2014 Central American and Caribbean Games
Sportspeople from San Juan, Puerto Rico
Universidad del Sagrado Corazón alumni